The Tardes is a  river in the Creuse département, central France. Its source is at Basville. It flows generally north. It is a left tributary of the Cher into which it flows between Évaux-les-Bains and Budelière.

Its main tributary is the Voueize.

Communes along its course
This list is ordered from source to mouth: Basville, Saint-Oradoux-près-Crocq, Crocq, Saint-Pardoux-d'Arnet, La Villetelle, Saint-Avit-de-Tardes, Saint-Silvain-Bellegarde, Lupersat, Champagnat, Saint-Domet, La Serre-Bussière-Vieille, Peyrat-la-Nonière, Saint-Priest, Le Chauchet, Saint-Julien-le-Châtel, Tardes, Lussat, Chambon-sur-Voueize, Évaux-les-Bains, Budelière

References

Rivers of France
Rivers of Creuse
Rivers of Nouvelle-Aquitaine